The Quinte Skyhawks are a Canadian Junior Football League (CJFL) team located in Belleville, Ontario and representing the Quinte Region. The team plays in the Ontario Football Conference (OFC) which is part of the CJFL and compete annually for the national title known as the Canadian Bowl.

History
The Skyhawks program first began as a youth organization in 2012 that first offered football camps in 2015 and was founded by Peter and Brenda Gabriel. On September 28, 2020, it was announced that the Canadian Junior Football League had granted the organization an expansion junior football team to begin play in the Ontario Conference in 2021. Warren Goldie was announced as the team's first head coach. The team also has a partnership with nearby Loyalist College for players to continue their post-secondary education.

References

External links
Official website

2021 establishments in Ontario
Canadian football teams in Ontario
Canadian Junior Football League teams
Sport in Belleville, Ontario
Sports clubs established in 2021